This was the first edition of the tournament.

Arantxa Rus won the title, defeating Victoria Jiménez Kasintseva in the final, 6–0, 6–1.

Seeds

Draw

Finals

Top half

Bottom half

References

Main Draw

ITF World Tennis Tour Maspalomas - Singles